The Carolina Chocolate Drops were an old-time string band from Durham, North Carolina. Their 2010 album, Genuine Negro Jig, won the Grammy Award for Best Traditional Folk Album at the 53rd Annual Grammy Awards, and was number 9 in fRoots magazine's top 10 albums of 2010.

Career
Formed in November 2005, following the members' attendance at the first Black Banjo Gathering, held in Boone, North Carolina, in April 2005, the group grew out of the success of Sankofa Strings, an ensemble that featured Dom Flemons on bones, jug, guitar, and four-string banjo, Rhiannon Giddens on banjo and fiddle and Súle Greg Wilson on bodhrán, brushes, washboard, bones, tambourine, banjo, banjolin, and ukulele, with Justin Robinson as an occasional guest artist.  All shared vocals.  The purpose of Sankofa Strings was to present a gamut of African American musics: country and classic blues, early jazz and "hot music", string band numbers, African and Caribbean songs, and spoken word pieces.  The Chocolate Drops' original three members: Giddens, Flemons, and Robinson, were all in their twenties when the group formed after Flemons' move from Phoenix (where he and Wilson lived), to North Carolina, home of Giddens and Robinson.  Wilson, nearly a generation older than the other Drops, was occasionally featured with the group into 2010, including contributions to the recordings, Dona Got a Ramblin' Mind, CCD and Joe Thompson, Heritage (with songs culled from Sankofa Strings' independently-released CD, Colored  Aristocracy) and nearly half of Genuine Negro Jig. All of the musicians sing and trade instruments including banjo, fiddle, guitar, harmonica, snare drum, bones, jug, and kazoo. The group learned much of their repertoire, which is based on the traditional music of the Piedmont region of North and South Carolina, from the eminent African American old-time fiddler Joe Thompson, although they also perform old-time versions of some modern songs such as Blu Cantrell's R&B hit "Hit 'em Up Style (Oops!)."

The Carolina Chocolate Drops have released five CDs and one EP and have opened for Taj Mahal and, in 2011, Bob Dylan. They have performed on Mountain Stage, MerleFest, and at the Mount Airy Fiddlers Convention. Additionally they have performed on A Prairie Home Companion, Fresh Air, and BBC Radio in early 2010, and at the 2010 Bonnaroo Music Festival in Manchester, Tennessee, and at the 2011 Romp, in Owensboro, Kentucky. On 17 January 2012 they appeared live on BBC Radio 3. They have performed on the Grand Ole Opry several times. They have also performed on the UK's BBC Television program, Later... with Jools Holland.

On February 7, 2011, the band announced that beatboxer Adam Matta and multi-instrumentalist Hubby Jenkins would be joining the band, while Justin Robinson was departing. In early 2012, they announced that the New Orleans based cellist Leyla McCalla was joining the band on its next tour. CCD contributed a track, "Political World," to the Bob Dylan tribute compilation, Chimes of Freedom (album) released in January 2012. Their next album, Leaving Eden, followed soon afterward in February 2012. In an interview, Jenkins said,
"Leaving Eden was an interesting album because [fiddler] Justin [Robinson] had just left the group, and they had already decided to record with Buddy Miller, and had even picked the recording dates. It was an interesting time to be coming in, because they were ready to do different things with the new members. So it was a trial-by-fire period."

They toured with Josh Ritter & the Royal City Band in 2012. Later in 2012, the Drops were nominated for numerous awards by the Chicago Black Theater Alliance for their work in Keep a Song in Your Soul: The Roots of Black Vaudeville.  Staged by the Old Town School of Folk Music in Chicago, written by Lalenja Harrington (Rhiannon Giddens' sister) and Sule Greg Wilson, and featuring veteran hoofer Reggio MacLaughlin, and ragtime pianist and MacArthur Fellow Reginald R. Robinson, the program examined the hopes and realities, music, and dances of the Great Migration.

Also in 2012, the Drops contributed a song, "Daughter's Lament", to The Hunger Games soundtrack.

In 2013, they were nominated for a Blues Music Award for 'Acoustic Artist'.

Also in 2013, the Drops contributed a song, "Day of Liberty", to the two-CD album 'Divided & United.

On November 12, 2013, the Chocolate Drops announced that Dom Flemons would be leaving to embark on his own solo career, and introduced two new members: cellist Malcolm Parson and multi-instrumentalist Rowan Corbett. 

In 2014 the Chocolate Drops worked with choreographer Twyla Tharp and dancers Robert Fairchild and Tiler Peck to create Cornbread Duet.

In 2014, the group stopped regularly performing together, and members have pursued solo work and other projects since. Hubby Jenkins left the band in 2016. Rhiannon Giddens has released a number of solo recordings and was recently named as the artistic director of the Silk Road Project.

Members

Current
Rhiannon Giddens: 5-string banjo, dance, fiddle, kazoo, voice
Rowan Corbett: Guitar, bones, snare drum, cajon, djembe
Malcolm Parson: Cello, melodica

Previous
Dom Flemons: 4-string banjo, guitar, jug, harmonica, kazoo, snare drum, bones, quills, voice
Hubby Jenkins: Guitar, mandolin, 5-string banjo, bones, voice
Adam Matta: Beatbox, tambourine
Leyla McCalla: Cello, tenor banjo, voice
Justin Robinson: Fiddle, jug, beatbox, dance, voice
Súle Greg Wilson: 5-string banjo, banjolin, bodhrán, brushes, bones, dance, gourd, kazoo, tambourine, ukulele, voice, washboard

Discography

Albums

Music videos

References

External links

 Carolina Chocolate Drops MySpace page
 Dom Flemons Papers, Southern Folklife Collection, University of North Carolina at Chapel Hill
 [ Allmusic discography]

Musical groups from North Carolina
Old-time bands
Nonesuch Records artists
Musical groups established in 2005
Culture of Durham, North Carolina
Performing arts pages with videographic documentation
Piedmont blues musicians
2005 establishments in North Carolina
Grammy Award winners